Upsilon Piscium is a solitary, white-hued star in the zodiac constellation of Pisces. It is faintly visible to the naked eye, having an apparent visual magnitude of +4.75. The star is drifting further away with a heliocentric radial velocity of +6 km/s.

This is an ordinary A-type main sequence star with a stellar classification of A3 V. It is 461 million years old – about 98% of the way through its main sequence lifetime – and is spinning with a projected rotational velocity of 91 km/s. The star has 2.8 times the mass of the Sun, about 2.2 times the Sun's radius, and is radiating 117 times the Sun's luminosity from its photosphere at an effective temperature of 9183 K.

Naming

υ Piscium is the Bayer designation for this star, which is Latinized as Upsilon Piscium. It has the Flamsteed designation 90 Piscium.

References

A-type main-sequence stars
Pisces (constellation)
Piscium, Upsilon
Durchmusterung objects
Piscium, 090
007964
006193
0383